There is about 1 MW of geothermal heating of communal buildings and 3 MW of baths in Ukraine. But there is no geothermal electricity generation.

Potential 
Ukraine has considerable geothermal resources that can be used mainly for heat supply. There are also prospects for binary geothermal power plant initiatives based on existing wells at abandoned oil and gas fields.

Ukraine has a good potential for the development of geothermal energy. This is due to thermogeological features of the relief and features of the geothermal resources of the country. However, at present, scientific, geological, exploratory and practical work in Ukraine is concentrated only on the geothermal resources that are represented by thermal waters. According to various estimates, the economically expedient energy resource of thermal waters of Ukraine is up to 8.4 million tons of oil equivalent per year.

Practical development of thermal waters in Ukraine was carried out in the temporarily occupied territory of the Autonomous Republic of Crimea, where 11 geothermal circulating systems were constructed, using modern technologies for the extraction of geothermal heat from the earth. All geothermal installations worked at the research and industrial stage.

Large reserves of thermal waters were also found on the territory of Chernihiv, Poltava, Kharkiv, Lugansk and Sumy regions. Hundreds of wells that have discovered thermal water and are in conservation can be restored for their further exploitation as a system for extracting geothermal heat.

In calculating the amount of possible consumption of low-temperature geothermal resources in the geoclimatic conditions of different regions of Ukraine, it should be taken into account that their intense exploitation can lead to a decrease in the temperature of the soil massif and its rapid depletion. It is necessary to support such a level of use of geothermal energy, which would allow exploiting the source of energy resources without harming the environment. For each region of Ukraine there is a certain maximum intensity of extraction of geothermal energy, which can be sustained over a long time.

According to the November 2011 National Renewable Energy Action Plans, the amount of energy produced by geothermal plants should increase significantly by 2020, with an expected volume of heat production of 2 630.7 thousand tp, with an intermediate target in 1 348,1 thousand t.p. by 2015. To achieve the goals, significant investments in production and heating networks would be required. Thus, the question of the policy of stimulation to give clear advantages to geothermal heat over heat from fossil fuels is actual, that is, the policy should work ahead.

The technical and economic analysis showed that on the basis of the Dnipro-Donetsk depression oil and gas wells it is possible to construct geothermal power plants with depths of drilling or disclosing wells up to 3 – 4.5 km. At such depths, the 90% thermal potential
of geothermal waters in productive oil and gas horizons of сarboniferous deposits does not exceed 108 ºC. In this case, the replacement of organic fuel and electricity by the heat of geothermal waters and rocks is much more profitable for providing heat and heating (by 3 –
5 times). Two wells from the depth of сarboniferous deposits can provide 0.4 – 4.5 MW of thermal energy.

See also 

Renewable energy in Ukraine
Solar power in Ukraine
Wind power in Ukraine
Biofuel in Ukraine
Hydroelectricity in Ukraine
Renewable energy by country

References

Sources 
 Great renewable energy potential in Ukraine
 GEOTHERMAL ENERGY RESOURCES OF UKRAINE AND THE STATE OF THE ART OF UTILIZATION THEREOF 
 Geothermal energy use, country update for Ukraine